Ordinary Sinner is a 2001 American romantic drama film directed by John Henry Davis and starring A Martinez, Elizabeth Banks, Kris Park and Joshua Harto.

Cast
Brendan Hines
Joshua Harto
Kris Park
Elizabeth Banks
A Martinez
Peter Onorati
Chris Messina
Daniel Sherman
Nathaniel Marston
Kia Joy Goodwin
Jesse Tyler Ferguson

Reception
The film has a 17% rating on Rotten Tomatoes.

References

External links
 
 

American romantic drama films
2000s English-language films
2000s American films